The women's 400 metre freestyle competition of the swimming events at the 1991 Pan American Games took place on 14 August. The last Pan American Games champion was Julie Martin of US.

This race consisted of eight lengths of the pool, with all eight being in the freestyle stroke.

Results
All times are in minutes and seconds.

Heats

Final 
The final was held on August 14.

References

Swimming at the 1991 Pan American Games
Pan